Church of Saint Matthew of Zolná is a Roman Catholic church situated in the suburb of Zolná in the city of Zvolen.

History 
According to the historic, handwritten document by the archbishop Thomas of Esztergom from 1311, Bychor and Zubrata, the sons of the head of Zólyom County, obtained the permission to build a fortified church with a cemetery in the village. The preservation of such a document is a rare occasion in present-day Slovakia. The church, however, is probably older than indicated by this document and was before consecrated to Saint Stephen. The building dates back to around 1280.

In 2000, Charles, Prince of Wales visited the church and recognized the modest beauty of the small church.

References 

Gothic architecture in Slovakia
13th-century Roman Catholic church buildings in Slovakia